Bayt Al-Suhaymi ("House of Suhaymi") is a Traditional Egyptian Islamic themed house and museum in Cairo, Egypt. It was originally built in 1648 by Abdel Wahab el Tablawy along the Darb al-Asfar, a very prestigious and expensive part of Islamic Cairo.  In 1796 it was purchased by Sheikh Ahmed as-Suhaymi whose family held it for several subsequent generations. The Sheikh greatly extended the house from its original through incorporating neighbouring houses into its structure.

The house is built around a sahn in the centre of which there is a small garden with plants and palm trees.  From here several of the fine mashrabiya windows in the house can be seen.  Today the house is a museum which foreign visitors can tour for 35 Egyptian pounds (15 for students).  Much of the marble floor work, wooden furniture, and ceiling decor is still intact. Restoration took place after the earthquake of 1992.

References

External links

 egyptianmuseums: Bayt Al-Suhaymi
 House of Suhaymi, Cairo, Egypt (Masterpieces of Islamic Architecture)
 Manzil al-Suhaymi (Bayt Al-Suhaymi) on archnet.org

Museums in Cairo
History museums in Egypt
Historic house museums in Egypt
Houses in Egypt
Medieval Cairo